Oumaima Bedioui (born January 27 1998) is a judoka who competes internationally for Tunisia.

Achievement
Bedioui won a bronze medal at the World Cadet Championships in Sarajevo in 2015. She was number 1 of the IJF World Ranking for cadets U40kg in 2014.
Bedioui won a silver medal at the Junior World Championships in Nassau, Bahamas in the 2018 World Championship Juniors. She won a bronze medal at the African Championships in Cape Town in 2019.

She won one of the bronze medals in the women's 48 kg event at the 2022 Mediterranean Games held in Oran, Algeria.

References

1998 births
Tunisian female judoka
Living people
Competitors at the 2022 Mediterranean Games
Mediterranean Games bronze medalists for Tunisia
Mediterranean Games medalists in judo
21st-century Tunisian women